Zielonka  (German: Grünhof) is a village in the administrative district of Gmina Golczewo, within Kamień County, West Pomeranian Voivodeship, in north-western Poland.

The village has a population of 10.

See also
History of Pomerania

References

Zielonka